The Blackwater River is a  tributary of the Lamine River in west-central Missouri in the United States.  Via the Lamine and Missouri rivers, it is part of the watershed of the Mississippi River. The Blackwater River was named from the character of its banks and water.

Course
The river flows generally east-northeastwardly through Johnson, Pettis, Saline and Cooper counties, past the towns of Sweet Springs and Blackwater.

The North Fork source is in the southwestern corner of Lafayette County near the small village of Chapel Hill and the South fork source is just to the southwest across the county line in the northwest corner of Johnson County.

Several sections of the river's upper course have been straightened and channelized.

See also
List of Missouri rivers

References

Columbia Gazetteer of North America entry

Rivers of Missouri
Rivers of Cooper County, Missouri
Rivers of Johnson County, Missouri
Rivers of Pettis County, Missouri
Rivers of Saline County, Missouri
Tributaries of the Missouri River